The Translation of the Relics of Saint Nicholas from Myra to Bari is a religious and folk holiday among the East Slavs and, to a lesser extent, the South Slavs and Eastern Romance peoples. It is celebrated on May 9 each year. For Old (Julian) Calendar churches, May 9 falls on May 22 of the New (Gregorian) Calendar. The feast commemorates the translation (movement) of the relics of Saint Nicholas from Myra (in present-day Turkey) to Bari, on the Italian Peninsula, to save them from the Turks, who were persecuting Christians and destroying churches and holy objects. To this day, the relics remain at the Basilica of Saint Nicholas.

One story of the translation

In 1087, nobles and merchants of Bari, Italy, visited the relics of Saint Nicholas in 1087 after finding out their resting-place from the monks who guarded them. According to one account, the monks showed the resting-place but then became immediately suspicious: "Why you men, do you make such a request? You haven't planned to carry off the remains of the holy saint from here? You don't intend to remove it to your own region?  If that is your purpose, then let it be clearly known to you that you parley with unyielding men, even if it mean our death." The men from Bari tried different tactics, including force, and manage to take hold of the relics. An anonymous chronicler writes about what happened when the inhabitants of Myra found out:

Professor Nevzat Cevik, the Director of Archaeological Excavations in Demre (Myra), has recently recommended that the Turkish government should request the repatriation of St Nicholas' relics, alleging that it had always been the saint's intention to be buried in Myra.  The Venetians, who also claimed to have some parts of St Nicholas, had another story: The Venetians brought the remains back to Venice, but on the way they left an arm of St Nicholas at Bari (The Morosini Codex 49A).

See also
 Nikoljdan, December 6
 Basilica di San Nicola

References

External links

https://web.archive.org/web/20110907060906/http://www.roca.org/OA/5/5m.htm
Saint in Bari

Saints days
Religion in Bari
Belarusian traditions
Russian traditions
Ukrainian traditions
May observances
Saint Nicholas
Eastern Orthodox Christian culture
Folk calendar of the East Slavs